Sir William James Montgomery-Cuninghame, 9th Baronet  (20 May 1834 – 11 November 1897) was a British Army officer from Scotland, Conservative politician and Victoria Cross recipient.

Early life
Montgomery-Cuninghame was born in Ayr to Sir Thomas Montgomery-Cuninghame, 8th Baronet of Corsehill and Charlotte Niven D. Hutcheson, the eldest of seven children. Between April 1849 and 1851 he was educated at Harrow School.

Military service
Montgomery-Cuninghame had a long and distinguished military career, which began in 1853 when, on 11 March 1853, he became ensign in the 1st Regiment (by purchase). By 29 April 1853 he had become a second lieutenant in the Rifle Brigade. In October 1853, the Crimean War broke out and he was present at the battles of Alma, Balaclava, Inkerman and the siege and fall of Sebastapol.

Montgomery-Cuninghame served in the Crimean War as a lieutenant in the 1st Battalion, The Rifle Brigade (Prince Consort's Own). On 20 November 1854 at Sebastopol, the Crimea, he, with another lieutenant (Claud Thomas Bourchier) was with a party detailed to drive the Russians from some rifle pits. Advancing on the pits after dark, they launched a surprise attack and drove the Russian riflemen from their cover, but, in the fierce fighting which ensued, the officer in command of the party was killed. The two lieutenants, however, maintained their advantage, withstood all attacks from the enemy during the night and held the position until relieved next day. For their actions they were subsequently awarded the Victoria Cross.

Lieutenant Montgomery-Cuninghame was mentioned in Lord Raglan's despatches and "his bravery elicited the admiration of General Canrobert, who instantly published an order expressive of his approbation." Montgomery-Cuninghame was one of the earliest recipients of the Victoria Cross. His Victoria Cross is displayed at the Royal Green Jackets Museum, Winchester, England. During the Crimean conflict, he was also awarded the Order of the Medjidie 5th Class
and the Turkish Crimea Medal

After the end of the Crimean War, on 22 November 1856, Montgomery-Cuninghame held the rank of captain and became an instructor of musketry at the Rifle Brigade He was still serving in the military when on 14 August 1867, he was promoted to major half pay by purchase

Nine months later, on 22 May 1868, he was appointed lieutenant colonel of the Inns of Court Rifle Volunteer Corps Then, on 28 August 1871 he was commissioned to Deputy Lieutenant of Ayrshire. In 1877, he was a major with the Ayr and Wigtown Militia. 
On 9 August 1884, Major Montgomery Cuninghame was granted the honorary rank of lieutenant colonel in the 4th Battalion, Royal Scots Fusiliers. On 17 October 1888 he was granted the rank of colonel in the Volunteer Force and placed in command of The Clyde Brigade. He also held the appointment of brigadier general of the Clyde Brigade and then of the Glasgow Brigade of the Volunteer Force.

In July 1897, he was expected to accompany the Volunteer Glasgow Infantry Brigade (which he had commanded since its inception) to Aldershot, where they were to perform duties akin to regular battalions stationed there.  This was the first time in the history of the volunteer movement this was to occur.  However, during the negotiations for this historic event, he resigned due to ill health.

Political career
Montgomery-Cuninghame sat as Conservative Member of Parliament for Ayr Burghs from 31 January 1874 to 31 March 1880.

He was a Justice of the Peace for the counties of Lanark and Wigtown.

Personal life
On 22 April 1869, he married Elizabeth Hartopp at Little Dalby, Leicestershire, daughter of Edward Bourchier Hartopp.

Together, they had 9 children – 2 sons and 7 daughters.  Their eldest child, Edith Honoria Montgomery-Cuninghame became the wife of Sir John Tilley (diplomat).

Montgomery-Cuninghame became the 9th Baronet of Corsehill on the death of his father on 30 August 1870.

He died on 11 November 1897, aged 63 at Gunton Old Hall, Lowestoft, Suffolk after a period of ill health.

He is buried in Kirkmichael Churchyard, Ayr with his wife, where a window commemorates him.

References

Monuments to Courage (David Harvey, 1999)
Scotland's Forgotten Valour (Graham Ross, 1995)

External links 
 
 Location of grave and VC medal (Strathclyde)
 
 Biography
 Memorials To Valour

1834 births
1897 deaths
People educated at Harrow School
Baronets in the Baronetage of Nova Scotia
British Army personnel of the Crimean War
Crimean War recipients of the Victoria Cross
Rifle Brigade officers
Members of the Parliament of the United Kingdom for Scottish constituencies
UK MPs 1874–1880
People from South Ayrshire
Royal Scots Fusiliers officers
British Army recipients of the Victoria Cross
Scottish Tory MPs (pre-1912)
People from Maybole
Montgomery-Cuninghame family